Bell Park is a 1.15-acre park along Montrose Boulevard in Houston, in the U.S. state of Texas. It is named for C.C. Bell, who donated the park land to the city.

The park features a statue of Christopher Columbus, donated to the city in 1992 by the group Italian-American Organizations of Greater Houston. In recent years the statue has become a target for vandalism as Columbus has grown controversial.

References

External links
 

Parks in Houston